Marvin Augustus "Preacher" Franklin Jr. was an American football player and coach. He served as the head football coach at Nebraska State Teachers College at Kearney—now known as the University of Nebraska–Kearney–from 1953 to 1954, compiling a record of 8–8–2.  Franklin played college football as an end at Vanderbilt University from 1935 to 1938. After leaving Kearney, he worked as an assistant coach at the University of Houston under head coach Bill Meek.  Franklin moved with Meek to Southern Methodist University (SMU) in 1957 and coaches the ends there for four seasons.  He resigned in 1961 to become head football coach at the Kent School in Kent, Connecticut.  After seven years at Kent, Franklin was hired as head football coach at Battle Ground Academy in Franklin, Tennessee.

Head coaching record

College

References

Year of birth missing
Year of death missing
American football ends
Houston Cougars football coaches
Nebraska Cornhuskers football coaches
Nebraska–Kearney Lopers football coaches
Providence Steam Roller players
SMU Mustangs football coaches
Temple Owls football coaches
Vanderbilt Commodores football players
Yale Bulldogs football coaches
High school football coaches in Connecticut
High school football coaches in Tennessee